Sagenista is a genus of sand wasps in the family Crabronidae. There are about 10 described species in Sagenista.

Species
These 10 species belong to the genus Sagenista:
 Sagenista austera (Handlirsch, 1893) i c g
 Sagenista brasiliensis (Shuckard, 1838) i c g
 Sagenista cayennensis (Spinola, 1842) i c g
 Sagenista cingulata R. Bohart, 2000 i c g
 Sagenista kimseyorum R. Bohart, 2000 i c g
 Sagenista pilosa R. Bohart, 2000 i c g
 Sagenista scutellaris (Spinola, 1842) i c g
 Sagenista sericata (F. Smith, 1856) i c g
 Sagenista tucumanae R. Bohart, 2000 i c g
 Sagenista vardyi R. Bohart, 2000 i c g
Data sources: i = ITIS, c = Catalogue of Life, g = GBIF, b = Bugguide.net

References

Further reading

 
 

Crabronidae